This is a list of seasons played by Bangkok United Football Club in Thai and Asian football, from 2002, when the club was then known as Bangkok University to the most recent completed season.

Seasons

P = Played
W = Games won
D = Games drawn
L = Games lost
F = Goals for
A = Goals against
Pts = Points
Pos = Final position

TPL = Thai Premier League

QR1 = First Qualifying Round
QR2 = Second Qualifying Round
QR3 = Third Qualifying Round
QR4 = Fourth Qualifying Round
RInt = Intermediate Round
R1 = Round 1
R2 = Round 2
R3 = Round 3

R4 = Round 4
R5 = Round 5
R6 = Round 6
GR = Group Stage
QF = Quarter-finals
SF = Semi-finals
RU = Runners-up
S = Shared
W = Winners

Seasons
 
Bangkok United
Association football in Thailand lists
Bangkok United